Olmai-ye Sofla (also Romanized as Olmāī-ye Soflá; also known as Owlmā-ye Pā'īn and Ūlmā-ye Soflá) is a village in Arshaq-e Shomali Rural District, Arshaq District, Meshgin Shahr County, Ardabil Province, Iran. At the 2006 census, its population was 99, in 25 families.

References 

Towns and villages in Meshgin Shahr County